Aldo Campatelli (7 April 1919 – 3 June 1984) was an Italian football manager and player who played as a midfielder.

Club career
Born in Milan, Campatelli debuted in Serie A at 17 years of age and played for Inter for twelve seasons. In his early years, he played as an offensive winger with an eye for goal; he subsequently moved to midfield and later also played as a defender. At twenty years of age, he had already won a league championship and had been called up to the Italy national team by Pozzo to replace Serantoni in midfield. In 1940 he won his second title with Inter becoming the club's captain and a pillar of the team's midfield, while still maintaining his great striking ability. After taking part in the 1950 World Cup he went to Bologna where two years later he closed a brilliant career to become a coach. In his last two years at Inter he became the idol of a defender from Friuli, Enzo Bearzot, who later became the coach of the Italian team that won the 1982 World Cup.

International career
A stylish player with fine ball skills, Campatelli played a few internationals for the Italy national team between 1939 and 1950 before being called up to the 1950 World Cup squad. He wore the number 10 jersey in the game against Sweden which was his last game for the 'Azzurri'.

Honours

Player
Inter
Serie A: 1937–38, 1939–40
Coppa Italia: 1938–39

External links
 Interfc.it 

1919 births
1984 deaths
Footballers from Milan
Italian footballers
Association football midfielders
Inter Milan players
Bologna F.C. 1909 players
Serie A players
Italy international footballers
1950 FIFA World Cup players
Italian football managers
L.R. Vicenza managers
Inter Milan managers
Bologna F.C. 1909 managers
Genoa C.F.C. managers